North Adams High School is a public high school located in Seaman, Adams County, Ohio, United States.  It is one of three high schools in the Adams County/Ohio Valley School District, the other two being Peebles High School and West Union High School.  The district also has a vocational school (Ohio Valley Career and Technical Center).

North Adams High School has been declared by the State of Ohio as a "School of Promise."

Background
The current North Adams High School building was completed in August 1997, along with three other public high schools in Adams County, Peebles, and West Union High School.  All three schools use the same layout and appear almost identical from the air.

Controversy
The four regular public high schools in Adams County were built at the same time and all four featured a large granite tablet outside the school carved with the Ten Commandments.  They were relocated after a lengthy four-year legal battle over the placement of the tablets on public property.

Athletics
See also Ohio High School Athletic Association and Ohio High School Athletic Conferences

References

External links

District website

High schools in Adams County, Ohio
Public high schools in Ohio
Public middle schools in Ohio